Weymouth Quay is a disused railway station in Weymouth, Dorset, England at the terminus of the Weymouth Harbour Tramway. Until September 1987 it was the regular terminus and starting point for boat trains to and from London Waterloo, linking to the ferry services with street running along the streets of the town.

After the regular boat trains were ended, the station was still occasionally used for special services, the last being a Pathfinder Tours charter on 2 May 1999. The track and station were no longer used at all after that, although they were still part of the rail network. The station buildings are now offices for Condor Ferries which operated a ferry service to the Channel Islands. However, with the purchase of its new ferry in 2015, Condor ceased to serve the port of Weymouth.

The line was designated "Out of Use (temporary)" for a period of two years by Network Rail on 15 January 2007, and again on 1 April 2009. Closure of the branch was proposed by Weymouth and Portland Borough Council, which was proposing to acquire the trackbed. In July 2014, it was reported that the sale of the line did not proceed and a campaign started to reopen the tram route claiming it would help with tourism and reduce car usage in the town. In 2020 the local authority gained funding to pull up the line and the track was removed in 2020/21.

References

External links 
 Station on navigable O.S. map located due north of lifeboat station

Disused railway stations in Dorset
Railway stations serving harbours and ports in the United Kingdom
Quay Railway Station
Quay Railway Station
Former Great Western Railway stations
Railway stations in Great Britain opened in 1889
Railway stations in Great Britain closed in 1940
Railway stations in Great Britain opened in 1946
Railway stations in Great Britain closed in 1987
1889 establishments in England
1987 disestablishments in England